Alfred Walter Stewart (5 September 1880 – 1 July 1947) was a British chemist and part-time novelist who wrote seventeen detective novels and a pioneering science fiction work between 1923 and 1947 under the pseudonym of JJ Connington. He created several fictional detectives, including Superintendent Ross and Chief Constable Sir Clinton Driffield.

Biography
Born in Glasgow in 1880, Stewart was the youngest of three sons of the Reverend Dr. Stewart, Clerk to the University Senate and Professor of Divinity. After attending Glasgow High School he entered Glasgow University, graduating 1902, taking chemistry as his major. His outstanding performance earned him the Mackay-Smith scholarship.

After spending a year in Marburg engaging in research under Theodor Zincke, he was elected to an 1851 Exhibition Scholarship and then in 1903 entered University College, London. Here he began independent research. His work, which formed part of his thesis, gained him a DSc degree from Glasgow University in 1907 and he was soon elected to a Carnegie Research Fellowship (1905–1908).

He decided to pursue an academic career and in 1908 wrote Recent Advances in Organic Chemistry which proved to be a popular textbook whose success encouraged him to write a companion volume on Inorganic and Physical Chemistry in 1909.

In 1909 Stewart was appointed to a lectureship in organic chemistry at Queen's University, Belfast and in 1914 was appointed Lecturer in Physical Chemistry and Radioactivity at the University of Glasgow. During World War I he worked for the Admiralty. In 1918 he drew attention to the result of a beta particle change in a radioactive element and suggested the term isobar as complementary to isotope.

He retired from his academic work in 1944 following recurrent heart problems.

Stewart is now chiefly remembered for his first novel, Nordenholt's Million (1923), an early ecocatastrophe disaster novel in which denitrifying bacteria inimical to plant growth run amok and destroy world agriculture. The eponymous plutocrat Nordenholt constructs a refuge for the chosen few in Scotland, fortifying the Clyde valley. The novel is similar in spirit to such disaster stories as Philip Wylie and Edwin Balmer's When Worlds Collide (1933) and anticipates the theme of John Christopher's The Death of Grass (1956).

Dorothy L. Sayers paid tribute to Stewart's The Two Tickets Puzzle in her The Five Red Herrings. She gave him full credit and built on one of his ideas for part of the solution of her mystery.

John Dickson Carr was also an admirer of Stewart's and Carr's first novel in 1930 mentioned two of Stewart's earlier novels with admiration.

Bibliography

Novels
 Nordenholt's Million, London, Bombay, Sydney: Constable & Co. Ltd., 1923; repr. New York: Dover Publications, 2016
 Almighty Gold, 1924
 Death at Swaythling Court, 1926
 The Dangerfield Talisman, 1926
 Murder in the Maze, 1927
 Tragedy at Ravensthorpe, 1927
 Mystery at Lynden Sands, 1928
 The Case with Nine Solutions, 1928
 Nemesis at Raynham Parva, 1929 ( Grim Vengeance) 
 The Eye in the Museum, 1929
 The Two Tickets Puzzle, 1930 (a.k.a. The Two Ticket Puzzle) 
 The Boathouse Riddle, 1931
 The Sweepstake Murders, 1931
 The Castleford Conundrum, 1932
 Tom Tiddler's Island, 1933 (a.k.a. Gold Brick Island) 
 The Ha-ha Case,1934 (a.k.a. The Brandon Case) 
 In Whose Dim Shadow, 1935 (a.k.a. The Tau Cross Mystery) 
 A Minor Operation, 1937
 Truth Comes Limping, 1938
 For Murder Will Speak, 1938 (a.k.a. Murder Will Speak) 
 The Counsellor, 1939
 The Four Defences, 1940
 The Twenty-one Clues, 1941
 No Past Is Dead, 1942
 Jack-in-the-Box, 1944
 Common Sense Is All You Need, 1947

Short stories
 After Death the Doctor. (London) Daily News, 25 to 29 January 1934

Nonfiction
 Stereochemistry, 1907
 Recent Advances in Organic Chemistry, 1908
 Inorganic and Physical Chemistry, 1909
 Some Physico-chemical Themes, 1922
 Alias J. J. Connington, 1947 (repr. 2015)

References

External links
 
Obituary of Alfred Walter Stewart (PDF)
Norbert Nail: Genialer Chemiker und Meister des Detektivromans. Mit mathematischer Logik auf Mörderjagd - Das biografische Rätsel rund um die Philipps-Universität, in: Marburger UniJournal Nr. 56 (2018), p. 40; Nr. 57 (2018/19), p. 32
 

1880 births
1947 deaths
Writers from Glasgow
Scottish novelists
Scottish chemists
Scottish crime fiction writers
Alumni of the University of Glasgow
Academics of Queen's University Belfast
Academics of the University of Glasgow
Scottish science fiction writers
20th-century Scottish novelists
Scottish male novelists
Members of the Detection Club
20th-century British male writers